Old Library or Old Library Building may refer to:

United Kingdom 
 Old Library, Bristol, a historic library building dating from 1740
 Old Library, Cardiff, previously the main public library for Cardiff, 1882–1988
 The Old Library, Liverpool, a former Andrew Carnegie library
 Old Library Building, one of the Newcastle University buildings at Newcastle University, Newcastle upon Tyne

United States 
 Old Library Building (Tucson, Arizona), listed on the NRHP in Pima County, Arizona
 Old Library Building (Maysville, Kentucky), listed on the NRHP in Kentucky
 Old Library (Bryn Mawr College), formerly known as the M. Carey Thomas Library
 Old Library, West Chester, Pennsylvania, dating from 1902
 Old Library Building (Chattanooga, Tennessee), listed on the NRHP in Tennessee
 The Old Library, an alternative name for Battle Hall at the University of Texas at Austin